Mehdi Qoli Khan Qajar was the khan (governor) of the Erivan Khanate from 1805 to 1806. He belonged to the Qavanlu branch of the Qajar tribe. Due to his ineffectiveness, the Iranian king (shah) Fath-Ali Shah Qajar had him replaced with Ahmad Khan Moqaddam, the beglarbeg (governor-general) of Tabriz and Khoy.

References

Sources 
 

People of Qajar Iran
19th-century Iranian people
Year of birth unknown
Year of death unknown
Qajar governors
Khans of Erivan
Qajar tribe